Cheng Fangwu (August 24, 1897 – 17 May 1984) was a top level Party elder 元老 who cut his teeth at the beginning of the long march, responsible for education of the Chinese Red Army and the party apparatus from the mid-1930s to the end of his life. Earlier in the 1920s he was active as an author of the new literature and a translator.

Biography
Cheng Fangwu was born in Xinhua County, Hunan in 1897. He went to Japan in 1910 as a student of Military Science at the Tokyo Imperial University. He returned to China in 1921 and joined the Creation Society circle of scholars with Yu Dafu and other Chinese intellectuals, publishing numerous articles promulgating the new literature. He was appointed to the faculty of Sun Yat-sen University in Canton in 1924 and also to the Physics faculty at Whampoa Military Academy. He joined the Kuomintang Party in 1925. Despite the establishment jobs he soon became close to Zhou Enlai and Mao Zedong and joined a failed Communist coup d'état. On the government arrest list, Cheng then went in exile to Japan and later Europe, specifically Germany. He mastered the German language and years later authored the direct translation from German to Chinese of Marx and Engels "The Communist Manifesto" which became texts for the Chinese Communist Party. 1928 he joined the Chinese Communist Party in Paris and published their house journal.

Cheng returned to China in September 1931 and soon went to Eyuwan (鄂豫皖), a soviet style administered area of about 3 north central Chinese provinces (Hubei, Anhui and Henan). This mountain region was a core Communist power base which they administered entirely. Cheng was the senior commissar responsible for most of the administrative activity, including the economy, education, taxation and transportation. At the second Chinese Soviet Congress in 1934, he was elected to various official positions including the Political Central Committee and to head the Party Education Committee. From then on he was always responsible for the Party education systems as they evolved.

Long March and Beyond 
October 1934 Cheng accompanied the Red Army on its epic Long March. One year later they arrived in the Yan'an caves of northern Shaanxi. Thousands of Chinese youths journeyed to Ya'an following the full scale Japanese invasion of China in 1937. Cheng established the Shaanbei Public Academy which was the official party school reporting directly to the Central Committee. In 1939 Huabei United University was established by combining 4 institutions including the Shaanbei Public Academy. 

This was a university on the move, following the progress of the Red Army. At one time due to certain special conditions, 1,500 students were sent behind the Japanese enemy lines. Cheng went with them and organized their continuing education which required scheduling surreptitious class gatherings. The People's Republic of China was established in 1949, People's University (Remin University) the following year. Cheng Fangwu was successively Vice-President, President and President Emeritus from then on.

Cheng Fangwu was a fervent dedicated Marxist to the core, and had the same commitment to cadre education. He required his education system to conform to reality, of which he experienced in abundance. One reality which he never anticipated was being attacked personally (two broken bones) with the University disbanded during the Cultural Revolution. Mao finally protected him in 1974 by setting up a special office for Cheng to translate Marx and Engels. He was rehabilitated in 1978 and his university re-established.

He was the President and Party Secretary of Shandong University in Jinan from August 1958 until January 1974. Shandong is a regular university, part of the Education Ministry. Cheng brought a fresh breeze and re-invigorated the University with his focus on grass roots reality and personal knowledge of the subject matter. He set a personal example by always writing his own memo's, reports and text notes.

Quotes and Vignettes -- 小镜头 

There are many colorful stories about Cheng Fangwu. During a criticism session, the lead persecutor was reciting a poem by Mao Zedong to threaten Cheng. The poem was saying that a hunter of tigers and leopards should not be afraid of bears. The speaker mispronounced the last word in the poem as "ba". Cheng replied, "You said it wrong, instead of 'ba' you want 'pi'!"  The entire hall applauded ... pi also means fart.

 Mao said of Cheng Fangwu ...
 "Shaanbei Public School will certainly do well because of having Cheng Fangwu in the field of Education and Chau Choun Chueng in the field of Military Technology."   on November 1937 in Northern China
 "Shaanbei Public School reflects the image of united revolution and China's development. China will not be destroyed with the existence of Shaanbei Public School."    on March 3, 1938 in Northern China
 "There are two precious lessons I give for the students of Shaanbei Public School: The first, insist on the direction of politics; The second, is to work hard and stride to the end. During the past seventeen years, when the communist group met extraordinary hardship and still insisted on their political direction, the struggling hardship became the whole communist tradition, and Cheng Fangwu is just this kind of man."   on April 1, 1938 at Opening Ceremony speech of the 2nd graduating year
 On May 21, 1976, one of the Communist Leader, Marshal Zhu De, age 90, visited Cheng Fangwu at Central Communist School and said to him, "It is important to understand Marxism. For this purpose we need a good translated book and your translated book (Cheng's 1976 translated book Communist Manifesto) is easy to understand. This good job has a worldwide meaning."
 Chinese leader, Chan Wing said in 1986: "Cheng Fangwu is our civil revolutionist, loyal warrior, educator, and social scientist."

Background Note  长征教育
Cheng Fangwu is a unique Chinese Communist Party Elder (元老). He was among the earliest well-known intellectual to overtly ally with Mao Zedong, well before many other political and military leaders. Mao gave him the job of educating the party cadre at the beginning of the Long March even though he was trained in military science in Tokyo. Under the Chinese Communist system, there is a party cadre (commisar) at every level next to a military commander or a civilian manager. This is the party secretary (书记) who has power over personnel decision on the basis of party loyalty and "ideological purity". 

The consequence is of course rampant pure politics without regard to job skills. During the Long March and in earlier years, many talented military officers were basically illiterate or barely literate. Cheng's schools and university on the march produced literate cadres who were next to the commanders. Under common duress, they provided  practical written communications  for widely dispersed military forces. Also by all accounts Cheng's personal example was to focus on reality and not on personnel politics even though he was a committed Marxist. Consequently, the cadre schools and university undoubted fulfilled an important function. Once the People's Republic was established in 1949, the party gained control of the entire education system and everything else. With no existential threat and only internal political strife, the worst aspects of the cadre system gained ascendancy from the early 1960s to 1978. With the "open policies" of Deng Xiaoping, there is no formal cadre system in the private sector of the economy, and the cadres began to take a back seat in the public sector. The universities under the Ministry of Education were modeled primarily after the American system with Schools (院) and Departments (系). These were established under the Republic of China dating from  1911. They vigorously reaffirmed their original approach to education after 1978. And in fact Cheng's Remin University itself expanded broadly along the same academic lines. The very strong marxist curriculum is now only part of the entire much broader curriculum.

In this respect Cheng Fangwu is a unique figure fulfilling a unique requirement at a unique time; a situation unlikely to be repeated with the present trajectory of China.

Published works
 "New Year Celebration", a novel, 1929, Creation Quarterly
 "Mission" a review, 1927, Creation Quarterly
 "Stray" novel and poems, 1927,Creation Quarterly
 "From Literary Revolution to Revoluationary Literature" essays with Guo Morou, 1928, Creation Quarterly
 "Collected Works of Fangwu" essays, 1928, Creation Quarterly
 "Literary Reviews" reviews, with You Dafu, 1928, Creation Quarterly
 "Xinxing Literature Collection" Reviews and travelogue, 1930, Creation Quarterly
 "Memoires of the Long March" Memoires, 1977, Remin Press
 "A University amidst the Fire of War" Memoires, 1982, Renmin Education Press
 "Collected Works of Cheng Fangwu" 1985, Shandong University Press
 "Communist Manisfesto" translation with Xu Bing, 1938, Hong Kong
 "German Poem Anthology" translations from Goethe and Heine with Guo Morou, 1927, Creation Quarterly

External links
 Cheng Fangwu's bio at Renmin University's website

Further reading

1897 births
1984 deaths
Presidents of Shandong University
People from Loudi
Educators from Hunan
Presidents of Renmin University of China
University of Tokyo alumni
Academic staff of the Northeast Normal University